College Hill is a historic neighborhood of Providence, Rhode Island, and one of six neighborhoods comprising the city's East Side. It is roughly bounded by South and North Main Street to the west, Power Street to the south, Governor Street and Arlington Avenue to the east and Olney Street to the north. The neighborhood's primary commercial area extends along Thayer Street, a strip frequented by students in the Providence area.

College Hill is the most affluent neighborhood in Providence, with a median family income of nearly three times that of the whole city.

Portions of College Hill are designated local and national historic districts for their historical residential architecture. In 2011, the American Planning Association designated the neighborhood one of the "Great Places in America".

Name
The toponym "College Hill" has been in use since at least 1788. The name refers to the neighborhood's topography and numerous higher educational institutions: Brown University, Rhode Island School of Design, Pembroke College, and the since–relocated Bryant University. 

Prior to Brown University's 1770 relocation to Providence, the area was known as Prospect Hill.

History
The indigenous Wampanoag and Narraganset people inhabited the region prior to the arrival of English settlers.

Settlement

In 1635, religious dissenter Roger Williams established the settlement of Providence Plantations near the confluence of the Moshassuck and Woonasquatucket Rivers. By 1644, this settlement had taken root around a natural spring at the base of what is now College Hill. In 1638, the settlers allotted home lots. Roughly six acres each, these narrow tracts extended from Towne Street (now Main Street) to Hope Street, falling largely within the bounds of modern College Hill. Back Street—originally a series of paths running parallel to Towne and Hope—developed into what is now Benefit Street.

In 1770, the college that became Brown University moved to College Hill, establishing its campus on land purchased by Moses Brown and John Brown. 

By the time of the American Revolution, the foot of the hill was densely populated with wharves, warehouses, shops, public buildings, and residential houses. Benefit Street was home to several hotels, including the Golden Ball Inn which hosted noted guests such as George Washington, Thomas Jefferson, and Marquis de Lafayette.

19th century
In the nineteenth century, precious metals and jewelry trading drove much business on North Main Street. 

In 1893, the Rhode Island School of Design (RISD) moved from a space leased in Downtown Providence to its current home at the base of College Hill. Over a century later, the school would expand by relocating its main library, undergrad dormitories, and graduate studios into Downtown buildings.

20th century
In 1935, Bryant College of Business Administration moved from Downtown Providence to College Hill.

Beginning in 1922, Brown University began expanding its property holdings as an attempt to increase on-campus housing for its growing student body. These efforts culminated in the 1949-1957 construction of Keeney and Wriston Quadrangles, which involved the demolition of 59 historic homes.

Through the middle of the 20th century, the area nearer to the waterfront and Statehouse became a working class neighborhood. Subdivided houses inhabited by these low-income communities became targets for demolition under one of the city's proposed urban renewal projects, spurred by slum clearance funds guaranteed by the Housing Act of 1949. 

Brown's expansion coupled with urban renewal proposals catalyzed the establishment of local preservationist organizations which sought to maintain the dominance of historic structures in the neighborhood. In the mid 1950s, the newly-founded Providence Preservation Society (PPS) and the City of Providence together solicited $50,000 in research and renewal funds from the United States Department of Housing and Urban Development. This grant financed the development of a study and plan entitled College Hill: A Demonstration Study of Historic Area Renewal. Published in 1959 the report recommended the use of both public and private investment to restore and re-historicize North Benefit street with the goal of raising property values. The subsequent preservation efforts spearheaded by the PPS rehabilitated existing buildings, demolished decrepit structures, and relocated historic houses from other portions of Providence to the area. 

This process, while lauded as a victory for historic preservation, directly resulted in the gentrification of the area, displacing the neighborhood's working class African-American and Cape Verdean communities. These efforts also resulted in the conversion of the formerly mixed-use area surrounding Benefit Street to an almost purely residential neighborhood.

Architecture

College Hill boasts architectural styles from the 18th century onward, including residences and institutional structures. 

As Providence's colonial core, the neighborhood contains a number of the city's oldest structures. Among these are the Governor Stephen Hopkins House (1707), the Benjamin Cushing Sr House (c. 1737), the Jabez Bowen House (1739), and the John Corliss House (1746).

College Hill is particularly noted for its 18th and 19th century mansions, many of which are situated on or near Benefit Street. Among these residences are the John Brown House (1786), Nightingale-Brown House (1792), Edward Dexter House (1795) and Thomas P. Ives House (1803), Corliss-Carrington House (1812), Thomas F. Hoppin House (1853), and Governor Henry Lippitt House (1865).

Other structures of note include the Fleur-de-lys Studios, Providence Athenaeum, Old State House, and Brick Schoolhouse.

Nearly all of the buildings situated near historic Benefit Street have been rehabilitated in some form. Preservation guidelines ensure that period specific new construction can be woven into the existing collection of buildings. As the area is home to one of the finest cohesive collections of restored 18th- and 19th-century architecture in the United States, the College Hill neighborhood experiences significant infrastructure and building reinvestment dollars compared to other regions throughout the state.

Government

College Hill is divided along Angell Street between Ward One to the south and Ward Two to the north. As of 2021, Ward One is represented in the Providence City Council by John Goncalves and Ward Two by Helen Anthony. Both are Democrats.

The most prominent public building in College Hill is the Providence County Courthouse which has entrances both on South Main Street, at the foot of College Hill, and Benefit Street further uphill. The building houses the Rhode Island Supreme Court, the state's highest court of appeal, as well as the Superior Court of Providence County and the Rhode Island Office of the Attorney General. Several blocks north along Benefit Street is the Old State House, originally built as the Colony House in 1762. Another public building on Benefit Street is the State Arsenal designed by Russell Warren in 1839.

Demographics
75.6% of College Hill residents are white while 13.6% are Asian, both well-above the citywide averages of 54.5% and 6.2% respectively. African-Americans and Hispanics each comprise about 5% of the population. A sizable portion of the population are seasonal students attending the local academic institutions and residing in collegiate housing or leases.

Median family income on College Hill is $121,521, well above the citywide average. About 5% of households live below the poverty line. Fewer than 1% of households receive any public assistance.

Universities and schools
College Hill is home to Brown University's main campus, and most of the Rhode Island School of Design, whose buildings are adjacent to Brown, along the western slope of College Hill.

The Moses Brown School, on Lloyd Avenue (the summit of College Hill) and the Wheeler School, on Hope Street, are notable private schools in the neighborhood. Hope High School is located at the corner of Hope and Olney Streets, is one of Providence's major public high schools.

Shopping and restaurants

Thayer Street
Numerous cafes, restaurants, and shops are located along Thayer Street, adjoining Brown University at Soldier's Arch. Both streets are home to numerous small and independent shops, though Thayer Street has a few chain stores. Brown University's bookstore is located on Thayer.

Thayer Street's Avon Cinema, dating back to the early twentieth century, is a noted College Hill landmark.

Parks
Prospect Terrace Park is located on top of College Hill, and allows for a scenic view of Downtown Providence, and the city and county beyond.
Riverwalk, located along the Providence River, is where part of the Waterfire festival is held.
Roger Williams National Memorial is on North Main Street.
Veterans' Memorial Park and Market Square is between South Main Street and Canal Street.

Landmarks

The base (western edge) of College Hill is the oldest area of the city. The College Hill Historic District includes much of the area, and has been recognized as a National Historic Landmark District by the Department of the Interior. The Providence Preservation Society and the Rhode Island Historical Society have preserved numerous historic buildings in the College Hill area. 

Landmarks include:

The Rhode Island School of Design Museum
The Old State House
The First Baptist Church in America
The First Christian Science Church on Meeting Street - A domed church on Meeting Street.
The Central Congregational Church
The Providence Athenaeum - The fourth-oldest library in America, located on Benefit Street
State Arsenal - An armory in service during the American Civil War, and the original headquarters of the Rhode Island State Police
The Shunned House
Dr. Willett house, 10 Barnes Street
Ward house, 140 Prospect Street
Birthplace of H.P. Lovecraft, 456 Angell Street, (formerly 194 Angell Street)
Market House

College Hill in popular culture
 "The Shunned House", a short story by H. P. Lovecraft
 The Case of Charles Dexter Ward, a novel by H. P. Lovecraft
 The Devil Wears Prada a novel by Lauren Weisberger
 Underdog, a superhero film
 Family Guy scene locations, including Brown University, Roger Williams National Memorial Park, John Brown House, Providence Fire Station No. 5, and North Main vantage
 Providence Athenaeum, location where Sarah Helen Whitman broke off her relationship with Edgar Allan Poe

Notable people
 Ambrose Burnside (military officer, politician, firearms, railroad exec.)
 Stephen Hopkins (politician)
 Sarah Helen Whitman

See also

References

Further reading

 Providence Neighborhood Profiles, College Hill

Neighborhoods in Providence, Rhode Island
Populated places in Providence County, Rhode Island